John Curran may refer to:

 John Curran (Agatha Christie expert), Irish literary scholar and archivist
 John Curran (baseball) (1852–1896), baseball player, often misidentified as Peter Curren
 John Curran (businessman) (born 1964), American businessman and CEO of ARIN
 John Curran (director) (born 1960), American film director and writer
 John Curran (financial journalist) (1953–2013), American financial journalist
 John Curran (footballer) (1864–?), footballer who played for Liverpool F.C.
 John Curran (Irish politician) (born 1960), Irish Fianna Fáil politician and TD for Dublin Mid West
 John Curran (Illinois politician), member of the Illinois Senate
 John Curran (news correspondent) (1957–2011), American journalist
 John Curran (musician), musician with A Global Threat
 John Elliott Curran (1848–1890), American author
 John Joseph Curran (1842–1909), Canadian politician and lawyer
 John Philpot Curran (1750–1817), Irish lawyer and politician
 Jack Curran (1930–2013), baseball and basketball head coach

See also
 John Currin (born 1962), American painter